

Incumbents
Monarch: Philip II

Births
Luis de Valdivia, Jesuit missionary (d. 1642)

References

 
1560s in Spain